Gonzeville is a commune in the Seine-Maritime department in the Normandy region in northern France.

Geography

Population

Places of interest
 The church of St.Samson and St. Cyr, dating from the twelfth century.
 The vestiges of two manor houses dating from the sixteenth century.

Notable people
Valérie Lemercier, (b. 1964) French actress, spent her childhood here.

See also
Communes of the Seine-Maritime department

References

Communes of Seine-Maritime